Jesús Selgas Cepero (born 24 December 1951) is a Cuban artist specializing in painting, tapestry, and installations.

Selgas was born in Cienfuegos, Cuba, and attended the Escuela Nacional de Arte (ENA) in Havana between 1968 and 1970. He went on to study at Havana's Escuela Nacional de Diseño, graduating in 1980. He moved to New York the same year, and in 1988 passed a course in photography at the Fashion Institute of Design.

Individual exhibitions
In 1976 Selgas held his first personal exhibition, under the name Acuarelas y Tapices ("Gouaches and Tapestries") at the Teatro Nacional de Guiñol, Havana, Cuba. In 1982, along with two other Cuban artists, he exhibited at the show Three Cuban Painters at Middlesex County College in Edison, New Jersey. Among other exhibitions during the period he displayed in 1990 at the Genesis Gallery, Chicago, under the name "Selgas. Icons". In 1995 he exhibited a show titled Remembrances  at the New World Gallery in Düsseldorf, Germany.

Collective exhibitions
Selgas's work appeared in 1977's Trabajos en fibra exhibition at the Havana Museo de Artes Decorativas. He participated also in the Genesis Gallery's 1989–90 Christmas show, in New York: Up & Coming Artists, an exhibition of the Canadian Imperial Bank Collection in New York, and in Mariel: A Decade After at the Museo Cubano de Arte y Cultura, Miami, Florida. In 1995 his work appeared in Art. Exhibit and Silent Auction of Works by Contemporary Artists at New York's Jadite Galleries.

Awards
Salgas was in 1977 awarded first prize for tapestry by the Havana Museo de Artes Decorativas. In 1989 he received the Marshall Cummings Prize at the New York Citywide Art Competition.

External links
 
  Jose Veigas-Zamora, Cristina Vives Gutierrez, Adolfo V. Nodal, Valia Garzon, Dannys Montes de Oca; Memoria: Cuban Art of the 20th Century; (California/International Arts Foundation 2001); 
 Jose Viegas; Memoria: Artes Visuales Cubanas Del Siglo Xx; (California International Arts 2004);   

Cuban contemporary artists
Living people
1951 births